Kevin Schade (born 27 November 2001) is a German professional footballer who plays as a winger for Premier League club Brentford, on loan from SC Freiburg.

Club career
Schade joined the SC Freiburg youth system in 2018 after a five-year stint with Energie Cottbus. He made his debut with the club's reserve side in July 2019 against Bahlinger SC, and scored his first goal the following week in a 2–1 defeat to Kickers Offenbach. In December of that year, Schade signed his first professional contract with the club. He made his first-team debut on 21 August 2021, coming on as a 71st-minute substitute for Roland Sallai in a 2–1 victory over Borussia Dortmund. Following his debut, he was quickly earmarked as one of club's bright young talents, seeing use primarily off the bench in his opening season in the Bundesliga. In November 2021, despite attracting interest from such clubs as Liverpool, Schade signed a new contract with the club.

Brentford
On 4 January 2023, Schade signed for Premier League club Brentford on loan until the end of the 2022–23 season with the club expecting to make the transfer permanent in the summer for a club-record fee on a five-year contract.

International career
Born to a German mother and Nigerian father, Schade is eligible to represent both Germany and Nigeria in international competition.

On 17 March 2023, he received his first official call-up to the German senior national team for the friendlies against Peru and Belgium.

Career statistics

Club

References

External links

2001 births
Living people
German footballers
Sportspeople from Potsdam
Footballers from Brandenburg
Association football forwards
Germany youth international footballers
Germany under-21 international footballers
German sportspeople of Nigerian descent
Bundesliga players
3. Liga players
Regionalliga players
SC Freiburg II players
SC Freiburg players
Brentford F.C. players
German expatriate footballers
Expatriate footballers in England
German expatriate sportspeople in England
Premier League players